George Hawkesworth Bond (1845–1891) was a British politician who was Member of Parliament for East Dorset from 1886 to 1891.

During a discussion of political slander in an 1895 debate of an amendment to the Corrupt and Illegal Practices Prevention Act 1883, Conservative MP Elliott Lees recounted how Bond had been dogged by a rumour that he had said that a red herring (a small preserved fish then associated with poverty) was a sufficient dinner for a working man. This created outrage among his constituents, some of whom protested by bringing the fish to meetings. Lees reported that, even eight years after Bond's death, when he expressed regret at the loss of Bond to another man, the man replied "Yes, but I do think that it was a pity he said that about a working man's dinner".

References 

1845 births
1891 deaths
Politicians from Dorset
UK MPs 1886–1892
Conservative Party (UK) MPs for English constituencies